Star of the Sea College is a Catholic School in George Town, Tasmania founded by the Presentation Sisters in 1957.

See also
 Star of the Sea College

Notes

High schools in Tasmania
1957 establishments in Australia
Educational institutions established in 1957
Primary schools in Tasmania